Becker O'Shaughnessey (born 31 January 1994) is an American tennis player.

O'Shaughnessey has a career high ATP singles ranking of 1364 achieved on 6 January 2014. He also has a career high ATP doubles ranking of 1048 achieved on 12 August 2013.

O'Shaughnessey made his ATP main draw debut at the 2014 BB&T Atlanta Open in the doubles draw partnering Korey Lovett. O'Shaughnessey also played college tennis at the University of Alabama.

References

External links
 
 

1994 births
Living people
American male tennis players
Sportspeople from Macon, Georgia
Alabama Crimson Tide men's tennis players
Tennis people from Georgia (U.S. state)